The 2012–13 Iranian Futsal Super League are the 14th season of the Iran Pro League and the 9th under the name Futsal Super League. Shahid Mansouri are the defending champions. The season will feature 14 teams from the 2011–12 Iranian Futsal Super League and two new teams promoted from the 2011–12 Iran Futsal's 1st Division: Shahrdari Tabriz and Gaz Khozestan. The regular season, was played from 26 July 2012.

Teams 

1- Persepolis, Firooz Sofeh and Foolad Mahan withdrew from the league before the beginning.
2- Rah sari and Dabiri Tabriz, in last season placed 13th and 14th in table and Relegatian to the 1st Division. But by the increasing of the number of teams, futsal committee decided to stay at the Super league.

Managerial changes

Before the start of the season

In season

League standings

Positions by round

Results table

Clubs season-progress

Statistics

Top goalscorers 

 Last updated: 28 July 2019

Cards 

 Last updated: 31 August 2019

Awards 

 Winner: Giti Pasand Isfahan
 Runners-up: Saba Qom
 Third-Place: Shahid Mansouri Gharchak
 Top scorer:  Ali Asghar Hassanzadeh (Saba Qom) –  Ahmad Esmaeilpour (Giti Pasand Isfahan) (28)

See also 
 2012–13 Futsal 1st Division
 2013 Iran Futsal's 2nd Division
 2012–13 Persian Gulf Cup
 2012–13 Azadegan League
 2012–13 Iran Football's 2nd Division
 2012–13 Iran Football's 3rd Division
 2012–13 Hazfi Cup
 Iranian Super Cup

References

External links 
 Futsal Planet 

Iranian Futsal Super League seasons
1